Bryant & Stratton College (BSC) is a private college with campuses in New York, Ohio, Virginia, and Wisconsin, as well as an online campus. Founded in 1854, the college offers associate degree programs at all campuses and bachelor's degree programs at some campuses. The college is approved by the New York State Board of Regents and accredited by the Middle States Commission on Higher Education.

History

John Collins Bryant, Henry Beadman Bryant, and Henry Dwight Stratton were early graduates of Folsom Business College in Cleveland, Ohio, which they later purchased from Ezekiel G. Folsom, who founded his school in 1848.  Folsom was a former student of Platt Rogers Spencer who developed a standardized style of writing useful in business transactions before the invention of the typewriter.

Platt Spencer played a role in the formation of Bryant & Stratton College serving as a partner and teacher at the school which originally focused on bookkeeping and standardized penmanship. Bryant & Stratton College was organized in 1854 to provide practical workplace education, and was formerly known as Bryant and Stratton Business Institute. A year later they developed programs for women.  The college became well known in the middle of the 19th century under Platt's influence.

In addition to the Cleveland school, Bryant and Stratton established business schools that operated under the name of Bryant & Stratton & Co. International Commercial Colleges in most major US cities. By 1864 as many as 40 to 50 schools existed. Tuition was $40 for an entire program of study. The chain was not without controversy about its marketing and business practices, and it declined in size after the death of Stratton.

In 2008, the private equity firm Parthenon Capital Partners bought a significant stake in the school.

On April 3, 2015, Bryant & Stratton College was placed on a Department of Education list to have its finances more closely scrutinized (a process called Heightened Cash Monitoring). Colleges placed on this list generally have federal funding restricted due to concerns of their financial responsibility.

In 2017, Bryant & Stratton Limited Partnership (family) acquired Parthenon Capital Partners' stake in the schools. The following year, the college opened a new campus in Racine, Wisconsin, closed its downtown Milwaukee campus, and moved its Cleveland campus to Solon, Ohio.

The college began a transition to non-profit status in 2020. It began by donating the school to a non-profit family foundation. Two years later, the college began requested that its status be formally reclassified as nonprofit. By early 2023 it was recognized as a non-profit institution by both its accreditor, the Middle States Commission on Higher Education, and the U.S. Department of Education.

Organization
Today, there are 17 physical locations and an online education division. The current president of Bryant & Stratton is David Vaden. President Vaden has worked in various capacities at the school for more than 13 years.

Academics

Faculty
Bryant & Stratton's online faculty consists of 40 full-time instructors and 430 part-time instructors. The Buffalo campus has 33 full-time instructors and 112 part-time instructors.

Programs 
Bryant & Stratton College offers associate and bachelor's degrees.

Athletics 

Bryant & Stratton College has Junior College Division II sports at several campuses and actively recruits high school students.

Men's sponsored sports by campus

Women's sponsored sports by campus

Coed sponsored sports by campus

Alumni

Notable students of the school include Henry Ford, R.J. Reynolds and Joseph E. Seagram. 
Lou Blonger, crime boss
Albert Elijah Dunning, theologian
Henry Ford, car manufacturer, billionaire, philanthropist
John W. Harreld, senator
James J. Heffernan, US representative
Antonio Joseph, politician
Shalrie Joseph, head coach of the Grenada national football team
John D. Larkin, founder of Larkin Company
Martin B. Madden, U.S. representative
J. L. R. McCollum, member of the Wisconsin State Assembly
Timothy McVeigh, American domestic terrorist
John William Moore, US representative
R. J. Reynolds, tobacco manufacturer
John D. Rockefeller, oligarch, billionaire, philanthropist 
Arthur Schoellkopf, industrialist
Joseph E. Seagram, Canadian businessman (founder of Seagram Distillery) and politician
Charles Woodruff, Brigadier General in the United States Army

Campuses
Bryant & Stratton launched its online division in 1997. The college provides selected degrees over the Internet. According to College Navigator, approximately 40 percent of BSC's students are participating as online students.

New York State campuses can be found in Albany, Buffalo, Syracuse, and six other locations. 
Ohio has four campuses, including Akron. Virginia has campuses in Hampton, Richmond, and Virginia Beach. In Wisconsin, there are three campuses.

Notes

References

External links

Private universities and colleges in New York (state)
Education in Buffalo, New York
1848 establishments in Ohio
Universities and colleges in Erie County, New York
Universities and colleges in Syracuse, New York
Private universities and colleges in Wisconsin
Private universities and colleges in Ohio
Private universities and colleges in Virginia
Universities and colleges in Milwaukee
USCAA member institutions